The Liederkranz of New York City is an organization devoted to cultural and social exchange as well as the sponsorship of musical events. Its activities are dedicated to the support, development and preservation of culture in New York City. Its objective once was to enhance German-American relations.

History
On January 9, 1847, twenty-five men of German heritage founded the Deutscher Liederkranz der Stadt New York, a male singing society that provided a musical and social outlet for German-American men and also sought to perpetuate the tradition of German music, in both the folk and classical traditions. 

By 1861, the society was invited to sing with the Philharmonic Society Orchestra, and its performances of Wagner excerpts at the Metropolitan Opera House and in Boston and Philadelphia were among the first performances of Wagner in the United States. The Chorus sang at the World Columbian Exposition in Chicago. Ferrucio Busoni performed piano works at this concert and others on the Liederkranz’s tour. Many well-known musicians have collaborated with the Liederkranz, including Jenny Lind, Victor Herbert, Ernestine Schumann-Heink, Raphael Josephi, Lilli Lehmann, Helen Traubel, and Lauritz Melchior. The Club has also feted Engelbert Humperdinck, Richard Strauss, and Siegfried Wagner. Well-known members of the Liederkranz include Carl Schurz and William Steinway, who acted intermittently as President from 1867 until 1896. Conductor Theodore Thomas, music director from 1882 to 1884 and from 1887 to 1888, used the Liederkranz choir in Wagner concerts. Composer Heinrich Zöllner was conductor and music director from 1890 to 1898. The organisation was officially renamed to "The Liederkranz of the City of New York" in 1919. Honorary members have included President Theodore Roosevelt, Walter Damrosch, and Lauritz Melchior. 

The Liederkranz has been involved in numerous charitable efforts for the benefit of New York City and its institutions, the Quaker Fund for German Relief, the destitute of the Chicago Fire, etc. The Society established the Liederkranz Foundation, Inc. on April 8, 1948 for the purpose of providing support to young singers and musicians to further their careers.
In December 1999 the Liederkranz of the City of New York donated its library of music scores and parts, Liederkranz Club and Liederkranz Foundation documents, and related materials to the Fales Library at NYU.

Award winners
Notable winners of the Liederkranz Foundation's annual vocal competition include:

 John Brancy, 2010
 Jim Burgess, 1987
 Amanda Forsythe, 2003
 Bruce Fowler, 1993
 Othalie Graham, 2003
 Megan Marie Hart, 2012
 Kathleen Kim, 2004

Liederkranz Hall
In 1881, while under the leadership of club president William Steinway, the club raised $150,000 in two days for the purpose of building a clubhouse and performance venue, Liederkranz Hall. The cornerstone was laid on October 1st, 1881 at 111-119 East 58th Street in New York City. The total cost of the four-story brownstone building, including land, was $325,000. Liederkranz Hall became a well-respected music venue, and was later the location of numerous Victor recording sessions. During World War I, the club's Board of Trustees passed resolutions offering Liederkranz Hall to the U.S. government for the duration of the war, prompting commendations from President Theodore Roosevelt. Faced with declining membership in the late 1940s, the club sold the building, which would eventually be utilized as a Columbia Records recording studio and converted into four television studios, CBS Studios 53-56, in 1950.

See also
Arion Society of New York

Sources

References

External links

The Fales Library Guide to the Liederkranz Collection

Choirs in New York City
Musical groups from New York City
1847 establishments in New York (state)
Musical groups established in 1847
German-American culture in New York City